Finders, keepers, sometimes extended as the children's rhyme finders, keepers; losers, weepers, is an English adage with the premise that when something is unowned or abandoned, whoever finds it first can claim it for themself permanently. The phrase relates to an ancient Roman law of similar meaning and has been expressed in various ways over the centuries. The 1982 English Court of Appeal case Parker v British Airways Board expanded the phrase, with the judgement of Donaldson L.J. declaring "Finders keepers, unless the true owner claims the article". Difficulties arise when exploring how best to define when exactly something is unowned or abandoned, which can lead to legal or ethical disputes, especially as jurisdictions often differ in their approach.

Application
One of the most common uses of "Finders, Keepers" involves shipwrecks. Under international maritime law, for shipwrecks of a certain age, the original owner may have lost all claim to the cargo. Anyone who finds the wreck can then file a salvage claim on it and place a lien on the vessel, and subsequently mount a salvage operation.
Philosophies, such as anarcho-capitalism, that advocate a right to own land and other natural resources often appeal to the doctrine of finders keepers in the case of claiming ownership of what was previously unowned (see Terra nullius).
In the United States, the Homestead Act allowed people to claim land as their own as long as it was originally unowned and the property was then developed by the claimant.
 In the field of social simulation, Rosaria Conte and Cristiano Castelfranchi have used "finders, keepers" as a case study for simulating the evolution of norms in simple societies.

See also
 Homestead principle
 Bailment
 Lost, mislaid, and abandoned property
 Adverse possession ("possession is nine-tenths of the law")
 Uti possidetis
 Usucapio/Usucaption
 Theft by finding

References

Property law
Legal idioms